Bawdsey Cliff is a  geological Site of Special Scientific Interest north-east of Felixstowe in Suffolk. It is a Geological Conservation Review site, and is in the Suffolk Coast and Heaths Area of Outstanding Natural Beauty.

This two kilometre long section provides the largest exposure of the Early Pleistocene Red Crag Formation, and it is rich in fossils of marine molluscs. It is described by Natural England as having great potential for the study of non-glacial Pleistocene environments.

The site is in the publicly accessible Bawdsey Beach.

References

Sites of Special Scientific Interest in Suffolk
Geological Conservation Review sites